Jamboree Park (also spelled as Jamburi Park) is an urban park in the Agrabad area of Chittagong, Bangladesh. The park has  water-body alongside  walkway and compound road, internal master drain.

Location
It is located at SM Morshed Road and the most visited urban park in the port city.

Gallery

References

External links

Parks in Bangladesh
Buildings and structures in Chittagong
Agrabad